Denny J. Bixler (November 1, 1940 – June 19, 1981) is a former Democratic member of the Pennsylvania House of Representatives.

Bixler was born in Johnstown, Pennsylvania November 1, 1940. He attended the University of Pittsburgh. In 1968, he was elected as a Democrat to the Pennsylvania House of Representative in a Special Election.  He was reelected and served three additional terms. He died June 19, 1981 in Altoona, Pennsylvania.

References

Democratic Party members of the Pennsylvania House of Representatives
1940 births
1981 deaths
20th-century American politicians